The Chinese Ambassador to the Arab League is the official representative of the People's Republic of China to the Arab League.

List of representatives

References 

the Arab League